Woolman is an English surname. Those bearing it include:

 Edna Woolman Chase (1877–1957), fashion journalism entrepreneur
 Collett E. Woolman (1889–1966), airline entrepreneur
 Harry Woolman (1909–1996), stunt driver 
 John Woolman (1720–1772), American religious leader and social activist 
 Mary Schenck Woolman (1860–1940), pioneer in vocational education
 Stephen Woolman, Lord Woolman (b. 1953), British jurist

English-language surnames